Globo Repórter is a Brazilian weekly documentary television show broadcast by Rede Globo, on Fridays at 10p.m., ever since its premiere in 1973.

The show addresses issues related to the Brazilian way of life, highlighting matters such as health, education, work and nature.

Presenters

Main hosts
 Sérgio Chapelin (1973–1983; 1986–1989; 1996–2019)
 Berto Filho (1983–1986)
 Celso Freitas (1989–1996)
 Glória Maria (2010-2022)
 Sandra Annenberg (since 2019)

Co-hosts
 Berto Filho (1973–1982; 1987–1989)
 Celso Freitas (1977–1983; 1996–2004)
 Carlos Campbell (1980–1989)
 Eliakim Araújo (1983–1989)
 Renato Machado (1996–1999)
 Alexandre Garcia (1999–2009)
 César Tralli (2008–2009)
 Heraldo Pereira (2008–2010)
 Alan Severiano (2009)

See also 
 Globo Network

External links 
  Globo Repórter - Official Homepage

Brazilian television news shows
Brazilian documentary television series
Rede Globo original programming
1973 Brazilian television series debuts
1970s Brazilian television series
1980s Brazilian television series
1990s Brazilian television series
2000s Brazilian television series
2010s Brazilian television series
2020s Brazilian television series
Portuguese-language television shows